Lynn Chandnois (February 24, 1925 – April 19, 2011) was an American football player who earned All-American honors for the Michigan State Spartans in 1949, won the NFL Player of the Year award for the Pittsburgh Steelers in 1952, and played twice in the Pro Bowl.

Biography

Early years
Lynn Chandnois was born in the Upper Peninsula of Michigan on February 24, 1925. He moved to Flint, Michigan to live with an aunt and attend school. Chandnois earned All-State honors at Flint Central High School in basketball and football.

After graduating in 1944, he joined the United States Naval Air Corps and served for two years where he achieved the rank of Aviation Machinist's Mate 3rd Class Petty Officer.

Collegiate career
Chandnois a 6 ft. 2 in. 195 lb halfback, defensive back and kick returner attended Michigan State University and was a four-year football standout for the Spartans. He also played basketball for one year. He ranks first in career pass interceptions (20) and interception return yardage (384), and was the team's MVP in 1948 and an All-American in 1949. He was the State of Michigan's Outstanding Amateur Athlete in 1950.

Professional career
He was drafted by the Pittsburgh Steelers in the first round (eighth overall) of the 1950 NFL Draft. He played in seven NFL seasons with the Steelers from 1950 to 1956.

Life after football

Death and legacy
Lynn died on April 19, 2011, in Flint, Michigan, survived by his wife Paulette, daughters Lynda Harris of Grand Blanc, Michigan, and Suzanne Arnold of Prescott, Arizona.

Only Gale Sayers has a higher lifetime NFL kickoff return average.

Footnotes

1925 births
2011 deaths
American football halfbacks
American football return specialists
Michigan State Spartans football players
Pittsburgh Steelers players
Eastern Conference Pro Bowl players
United States Navy non-commissioned officers
People from Delta County, Michigan
Players of American football from Flint, Michigan
Military personnel from Michigan
Flint Central High School alumni